Red Rock Brewery, or Red Rock Brewing Co., is a brewery based in Salt Lake City, Utah, United States.

There are four locations, including the flagship in downtown Salt Lake City and another in Park City.

References

External links
 

Beer brewing companies based in Utah
Companies based in Salt Lake City